The Coming of the Law is a 1919 American silent Western film directed by Arthur Rosson and starring Tom Mix, Agnes Vernon and George Nichols.

Cast
 Tom Mix as Kent Hollis
 Agnes Vernon as Nellie Hazelton 
 George Nichols as Big Bill Dunlavey 
 Jack Curtis as Judge Graney
 Sid Jordan as Neal Norton
 Bowditch M. Turner as Potter
 Charles Le Moyne as Ten Spot
 Pat Chrisman as Yuma Ed
 Lewis Sargent as Jiggs
 Jack Dill as Ace
 Harry Dunkinson as Sheriff
 Buck Jones as Henchman

References

External links
 

1919 films
1919 Western (genre) films
American black-and-white films
Fox Film films
Films directed by Arthur Rosson
Silent American Western (genre) films
1910s American films